Encyclopedia of American Religions, renamed Melton's Encyclopedia of American Religions in the eighth edition, is a reference book by J. Gordon Melton first published in 1978, by Consortium Books, A McGrath publishing company. It is currently in its ninth edition and has become a standard reference work in the study of religion in the United States.

References

Further reading

External links
 The Encyclopedia of American Religions (1978; first edition)
 The Encyclopedia of American Religions (1987; second edition)
 Encyclopedia of American Religions (1999; sixth edition)
 Melton's Encyclopedia of American Religions (2009; eighth edition)

1978 non-fiction books
1987 non-fiction books
1998 non-fiction books
2002 non-fiction books
20th-century encyclopedias
American Religions
Books by J. Gordon Melton
Encyclopedias of religion
English-language books
History of religion in the United States
Historiography of the United States